In aviation, assisted takeoff is any system for helping aircraft to get into the air (as opposed to strictly under its own power). The reason it might be needed is due to the aircraft's weight exceeding the normal maximum takeoff weight, insufficient power, insufficient available runway length, or a combination of all three factors. Assisted takeoff is also required for gliders, which do not have an engine and are unable to take off by themselves.

Catapults (CATO)

A well-known type of assisted takeoff is an aircraft catapult. In modern systems fitted on aircraft carriers, a piston, known as a shuttle, is propelled down a long cylinder under steam pressure. The aircraft is attached to the shuttle using a tow bar or launch bar mounted to the nose landing gear (an older system used a steel cable called a catapult bridle; the forward ramps on older carrier bows were used to catch these cables), and is flung off the deck at about 15 knots above minimum flying speed, achieved by the catapult in a four-second run.

The United States is replacing carrier steam catapults with linear induction motors. The system is called the electromagnetic aircraft launch system (EMALS). An electromagnetic wave traveling through the motor propels the armature along its length, pulling the plane with it. This system allows more precise control over the launch power, causing less wear on the aircraft.

JATO and RATO

JATO stands for 'Jet-assisted takeoff' (and the similar RATO for 'Rocket-assisted takeoff'). In the JATO  and RATO systems, additional engines are mounted on the airframe which are used only during takeoff. After that the engines are usually jettisoned, or else they just add to the parasitic weight and drag of the aircraft. However, some aircraft such as the Avro Shackleton MR.3 Phase 2, had permanently attached JATO engines.  The four J-47 turbojet engines on the B-36 were not considered JATO systems; they were an integral part of the aircraft's propulsion, and were used during takeoff, climb, and cruise at altitude. The Hercules LC-130 can be equipped with a JATO rocket system to shorten takeoff as used in the LC-130 Skibird for polar missions.

During WW2 the German Arado Ar 234 and the Messerschmitt Me 323 "Gigant" used rocket units beneath the wings for assisted takeoff.  Such systems were popular during the 1950s, when heavy bombers started to require two or more miles of runway to take off fully laden. This was exacerbated by the relatively low power available from jet engines at the time—for example the Boeing B-52 Stratofortress required eight turbojet engines to yield the required performance, and still needed RATO for very heavy payloads (a proposed update of the B-52 replaces these with half the number of much more powerful engines).  In a Cold War context, RATO and JATO bottles were seen as a way for fighter aircraft to use the undamaged sections of runways of airfields which had been attacked.

Gliders

Glider aircraft which do not have an engine also require an assisted takeoff. Apart from self launching gliders, EASA recognizes four other launch methods: winch launches, aerotows, bungee launches and car tows.

Gravity assistance
Early pioneers in powered and unpowered flight used gravity to accelerate their aircraft to a speed which allowed its wings to generate enough lift to achieve independent flight. These included attempts to achieve flight from towers, city walls and cliffs. Generally more successful were attempts in which speed was built up by accelerating down hills and mountain slopes, sometimes on rails or ramps.

Mother ship (carrier) aircraft

Another form of gravity assistance is when an aircraft is released from a larger mother ship or mother craft. This may be because the daughter craft is incapable of taking off normally e.g. the atmospheric flight tests of the Space Shuttle.

Usually the rationale for such a system is to free the daughter craft from the need to climb to its release height under its own power. This allows the daughter craft to be designed with fewer weight and aerodynamic restrictions allowing for exotic configurations to be used or tested, for example the recent SpaceShipOne, and previously the Bell X-1 and other X-planes.

In the interwar years, in order to achieve long ranges with the technology of the time, trials were undertaken with floatplanes piggy-backed atop flying boats. With the floatplane carried part of the way to its destination and freed from having to use any of its own fuel in the initial climb, these combinations could deliver light but time-critical cargos faster and farther than a single individual aircraft (for example the Short Mayo Composite).

Hot air balloons have acted as "motherships" to hang gliders and para gliders in altitude and distance record attempts.

See also
 Colditz Cock glider, for an example of gravity assistance.
 History of aviation, for the work of the early pioneers.
 Silbervogel, a long-range bomber proposal, using a rail-mounted captive rocket booster.

References

Types of take-off and landing